Gina Bari Kolata (born February 25, 1948) is an American science journalist, writing for The New York Times.

Life and career
Kolata was born Gina Bari in Baltimore, Maryland. Her mother, mathematician Ruth Aaronson Bari (1917–2005), was of Jewish descent. Her father, Arthur Bari (1913–2006), was a diamond setter of Italian heritage. He was a WWII Marine Corps veteran who served in the South Pacific. One of her sisters is Hood College art historian Dr. Martha Bari. Another was Earth First! environmental activist, feminist and assassination attempt survivor Judi Bari (1949–1997).

Kolata studied molecular biology as a graduate student at the Massachusetts Institute of Technology. She received a master's degree from University of Maryland, College Park in mathematics. She joined Science magazine, published by the American Association for the Advancement of Science, as a copy editor in 1973, and wrote for it as a journalist in the news section from 1974 until she moved to The New York Times in September 1987. She remains a health & science reporter at the newspaper. Kolata has taught writing as a visiting professor at Princeton University and lectures across the country.

She is a "self-proclaimed exercise addict" (who thinks nothing of a 100-mile bike ride as a reward), according to a Times advertisement for itself.

Her husband, William G. Kolata, has taught mathematics and served as the technical director of the non-profit Society for Industrial and Applied Mathematics in Philadelphia, a society for mathematicians. The couple have two children, Therese  and Stefan.

Books

Clone: The Road to Dolly, and the Path Ahead, 
Flu: The Story of the Great Influenza Pandemic of 1918 and the Search for the Virus that Caused It, Touchstone 2001 
Sex in America: A Definitive Survey, 
The Baby Doctors: Probing the Limits of Fetal Medicine,  (out of print)
Ultimate Fitness: The Quest for Truth about Health and Exercise, 

Mercies in Disguise: A Story of Hope, a Family's Genetic Destiny, and the Science that Rescued Them, St. Martin's Press, 2017

Other publications

 Kolata, Gina Bari. "Water Structure and Ion Binding: A Role in Cell Physiology", Science, 192 (4254), June 18, 1976, pp. 1220–1222.

References

External links
Recent and archived news articles by Gina Kolata of The New York Times.
Gina Kolata at SourceWatch
Rethinking Thin by Gina Kolata, Official Book site

1948 births
Living people
The New York Times writers
American people of Polish-Jewish descent
American science journalists
American women journalists
Jewish American writers
Massachusetts Institute of Technology School of Science alumni
University of Maryland, College Park alumni
Women science writers
20th-century American journalists
20th-century American women writers
21st-century American journalists
21st-century American women writers
Writers from Baltimore
Journalists from Maryland
American writers of Italian descent
21st-century American Jews